The Col de Portet d'Aspet (elevation ) is a mountain pass in the central Pyrenees in the department of Haute-Garonne in France. It is situated on the D618 road between Aspet and  Saint-Girons and connects the Ger and Bouigane valleys, on the slopes of the Pic de Paloumère.

Details of climb

The climb proper starts at the D618/D44 junction (also the start of the climb to the Col de Menté), / from the summit (at 9.6%), with several sections in excess of 11%; the maximum gradient is 12.8%,  from the summit.

Appearances in Tour de France
The Col de Portet d'Aspet was first used in the Tour de France in 1910 and has appeared regularly since. The leader over the summit in 1910 was Octave Lapize.

Since 1947, the Col has featured 32 times including on Stage 12 of the 2015 race.

In the 1973 tour Raymond Poulidor almost died on the descent from the Portet d'Aspet when he plunged off the road into a ravine, taking a serious blow to the head and crawling out with the help of the race director, Jacques Goddet.

Fabio Casartelli

On 18 July 1995, during the fifteenth stage of the 1995 Tour de France, Fabio Casartelli and a few other riders crashed on the descent of the Col de Portet d'Aspet. Casartelli sustained heavy facial and head injuries and lost consciousness. While being transported via helicopter to a local hospital, he stopped breathing and after numerous resuscitation attempts was declared dead. The Société du Tour de France and the Motorola team placed a memorial stone dedication to Casartelli on the spot where he crashed.

References

External links
Camping on top
Col de Portet d'Aspet on Google Maps (Tour de France classic climbs)

Mountain passes of Haute-Garonne
Mountain passes of the Pyrenees
Climbs in cycle racing in France